Pedro Rivas Cuéllar (30 June 1917 – 15 October 2008) was a Mexican politician and radio pioneer affiliated with the Institutional Revolutionary Party. He served as Municipal President of Aguascalientes from 1981 to 1983. In 1936 he founded XEBI-AM, the first radio station in central Mexico, which grew into a multi-station broadcaster known as Radiogrupo.

See also
 List of mayors of Aguascalientes

References

1917 births
2008 deaths
People from Aguascalientes City
Institutional Revolutionary Party politicians
20th-century Mexican politicians
Politicians from Aguascalientes
Municipal presidents of Aguascalientes